Jedi Blue is the name of an agreement between Alphabet and Meta Platforms that allegedly gave Facebook an illegal advantage in Google's ad auctions in exchange for Facebook's word that it would end its own ad service plans.

History 
In 2007 Google purchased DoubleClick and its DoubleClickForPublishers advertising system. Header bidding emerged in 2017 as a new way for purchasers to buy ad space. It allowed advertisers to participate in auctions across multiple ad platforms (such as Google's). Facebook announced plans to become header bidding-compatible. This would allow Facebook advertisers to bypass Google's platform, adding to Facebook's revenues and subtracting from Google's. In 2018, Facebook and Google came to an agreement, leading Facebook to retreat from header bidding that became a focus in the suit.

Multiple U.S. states sued Google in 2020. Details about the agreement were obtained in the course of the lawsuit.

On March 11, 2022, an investigation of the agreement was started in the European Union and the United Kingdom by antitrust regulators, with claims that it undermined competition in the advertising market.

Agreement 
Facebook agreed to reduce its participation in header bidding in return for "information, speed, and other advantages" that would come from staying with Google. Facebook would receive a guarantee of 90% of auctions regardless of the bids; 300 ms to bid (vs 160 offered to others), along with the ability to identify 80% of smartphone users and 60% of web users.

Defendant responses

Google 
Google spokesperson Peter Schottenfels said, *Despite Attorney General Paxton's three attempts to re-write his complaint, it is still full of inaccuracies and lacks legal merit ... There is vigorous competition in online advertising, which has reduced ad tech fees, and expanded options for publishers and advertisers."

Facebook 
Meta spokesperson Christopher Sgro said, "Meta's non-exclusive bidding agreement with Google and the similar agreements we have with other bidding platforms, have helped to increase competition for ad placements ... These business relationships enable Meta to deliver more value to advertisers while fairly compensating publishers, resulting in better outcomes for all."

References 

Facebook litigation
Google litigation
Online advertising